The Clown's Prayer is a poem or prayer that comedians of various sorts use for inspiration. There have been several poems that have gone by that name.

Author unknown
The original author of this poem is unknown. There are several variations on this poem. Chris Farley (from Saturday Night Live and Tommy Boy) was known to have carried this prayer with him in his wallet. It commonly includes the following four verses:

As I stumble through this life,
help me to create more laughter than tears,
dispense more happiness than gloom,
spread more cheer than despair.

Never let me become so indifferent,
that I will fail to see the wonders in the eyes of a child,
or the twinkle in the eyes of the aged.

Never let me forget that my total effort is to cheer people,
make them happy, and forget momentarily,
all the unpleasantness in their lives.

And in my final moment,
may I hear You whisper:
"When you made My people smile,
you made Me smile."
Occasionally the following verse is inserted between the third and fourth verses above:
Never let me acquire success to the point that
I discontinue calling on my Creator in the hour of need,
Acknowledging and thanking Him in the hour of plenty.

Clowns International
Clowns International hosts a service every year on the first Sunday in February at The Clowns' Church in London, and they recite a version of the Clown's Prayer then.

Walter Grogan
This version was written by Walter Grogan and published in The Pall Mall Magazine in 1907.
Lord, I am poor, I have no gift
Meet for Thy shrine;
My life is spent in joke and jest,
So empty, vain, e'en at its best,
This life of mine.
But, Lord, beneath my mirthful face
I hide a tear,
And when the crowd laugh at the fair
They seem to gibe at my despair
And mock my fear.
Lord, I am poor save in this wise:
A child have I,
And as I joke the best I may,
He, uncomplaining fades away
And soon must die.
Lord, thou hast many in thy home,
I only one;
Think, Lord, a jester's life is sad,
Change not "he has" into "he had," --
Grant me my son.

See also
Christian comedy
Genesius of Rome

References

Clowning
Prayer
Poems